The 2012–13 season (35th edition) of BAI Basket kicked off on November 16, 2012 with 10 teams playing the regular season in a double round robin system. The 5 best teams qualified for group A and the last five, group B in an intermediate stage, in which each group will play in a double round robin, at the end of which the best four teams of group A are playing the final four for the title in a round robin system at four rounds. The relegated team from group A in the intermediate stage joined the best three teams of group B from the intermediate stage to play for the 5th-8th place classification whereas the last two teams will play for the last two.

Primeiro de Agosto won the championship after finishing the final four with a 9–3 record.

BAI Basket Participants (2012–13 Season)

Regular Season (November 16, 2012 - February 16, 2013)

Serie A

As the group winner, Petro Atlético is awarded a bonus point for the group stage.

Serie B

Group Stage (February 22 - April 12, 2013)

Serie A

Serie B

Serie A Standings

As the group winner, Primeiro de Agosto is awarded a bonus point for the final four.

Serie B Standings

5th–8th  Place  (April 26 - May 21, 2013)

Final Four (April 26 - May 21, 2013)

Final Four Standings

R. do Libolo vs. Interclube

1º de Agosto vs. Petro Atlético

Petro Atlético vs. R. do Libolo

1º de Agosto vs. Interclube

R. do Libolo vs. 1º de Agosto

Interclube vs. Petro Atlético

Awards
 2013 BAI Basket MVP   Cedric Isom (Primeiro de Agosto)  2013 BAI Basket Top Scorer   Carlos Morais (Petro Atlético)  2013 BAI Basket Top Rebounder   Eduardo Mingas (Interclube)  2013 BAI Basket Top Assists   Cedric Isom (Primeiro de Agosto)

Final Standings

All Tournament Team
  Cedric Isom (1º de Agosto)   Carlos Morais (Petro Atlético)   Reggie Moore (1º de Agosto)   Eduardo Mingas (Interclube)   Kikas Gomes (1º de Agosto)

See also
 2013 Angola Basketball Cup
 2013 Angola Basketball Super Cup
 2013 Victorino Cunha Cup

External links
Official Website 
Eurobasket.com League Page

References

Angolan Basketball League seasons
League
Angola